O'Neal Point is a headland on the east side of the Arctowski Peninsula, Danco Coast, Graham Land, Antarctica. The point stands between the entrances of Beaupre Cove and Piccard Cove in Wilhelmina Bay and lies two nautical miles (3.7 km) west of Pelseneer Island. Named after James D. O'Neal, cartographer, with the Special Maps Branch of the  U.S. Geological Survey. James D. O'Neal was United States Observer with the Chilean Antarctic Expedition, from October 1956 to April 1957, working in the South Shetland Islands and northwestern Antarctic Peninsula.

References 

Headlands of Graham Land
Danco Coast